Manuel Verde (born 11 November 1966) is a Mexican boxer. He competed in the men's light heavyweight event at the 1992 Summer Olympics.

His son, Marco, is also a boxer.

References

External links
 

1966 births
Living people
Light-heavyweight boxers
Mexican male boxers
Olympic boxers of Mexico
Boxers at the 1992 Summer Olympics
Central American and Caribbean Games bronze medalists for Mexico
Competitors at the 1990 Central American and Caribbean Games
Place of birth missing (living people)
Central American and Caribbean Games medalists in boxing
Boxers from Sinaloa
Sportspeople from Mazatlán
20th-century Mexican people